Kevin Michael McClain (born October 21, 1996) is an American basketball player, with Fos Provence Basket of the LNB Pro A. Originally from Jennings, Florida, McClain committed to Belmont University.

High school career
McClain attended Hamilton County High School, where he was coached by Patrick Murphy. McClain signed with Belmont on April 15, 2015. He chose the Bruins over offers from St. Bonaventure University and the University of North Carolina at Asheville.

College career
As a freshman, McClain averaged 5.4 points and 1.3 rebounds per game. As a sophomore, McClain posted 4.6 points, 1.3 rebounds, and 1.1 assists per game. McClain averaged 12.6 points, 3.8 rebounds and 2.1 assists per game as a junior, his first season as a starter. As a senior, McClain averaged 16.8 points, 3.6 rebounds and 3.9 assists per game and was named to the All-OVC First Team. He scored 27 points at Southeast Missouri State on March 2, 2019, to lead Belmont to an Ohio Valley Conference regular season title. In the NCAA Tournament, McClain posted 29 points against Temple, leading Belmont to an 81-70 victory. He finished 11th on Belmont's NCAA Division I era career scoring list with 1,279 points.

Professional career
After going undrafted in 2019, McClain signed with the Golden State Warriors for the Summer League. On July 3, 2019, he signed with EWE Baskets Oldenburg of the German Basketball Bundesliga. McClain has ties to Germany, as his mother was born there and his grandmother lives in the country. On August 11, 2020, he signed with  Fos Provence Basket of the LNB Pro A.

References

External links
 RealGM profile
 Belmont Bruins bio

1996 births
Living people
American expatriate basketball people in France
American expatriate basketball people in Germany
Basketball players from Florida
Belmont Bruins men's basketball players
EWE Baskets Oldenburg players
Fos Provence Basket players
People from Hamilton County, Florida
Point guards